Deer Park Farm was a historic home located at Newark in New Castle County, Delaware.

Background
It was built in 1841, and was a three-story, five-bay, center-hall-plan with a shallowly-pitched roof in the Greek Revival style.  It had a two-story kitchen wing and one-story library wing.  It was the home of James S. Martin, a major developer in Newark in the 1840s and 1850s.  In 1909, the property was sold to the Improved Order of Red Men, a fraternal organization, who used it to provide a home for retired Red Men and their wives.  From 1953 to 1971, it housed fraternities. The house has been demolished and the property occupied by a Christian Science Church.

It was added to the National Register of Historic Places in 1983.

References

Houses on the National Register of Historic Places in Delaware
Greek Revival houses in Delaware
Houses completed in 1841
Houses in New Castle County, Delaware
Improved Order of Red Men
National Register of Historic Places in New Castle County, Delaware